Wolfram Thiem (12 June 1956 – 22 July 2011) was a German rower. He competed at the 1976 Summer Olympics and the 1984 Summer Olympics.

References

External links
 

1956 births
2011 deaths
German male rowers
Olympic rowers of West Germany
Rowers at the 1976 Summer Olympics
Rowers at the 1984 Summer Olympics
Sportspeople from Lower Saxony